IFP (Previously India Film Project) is a content festival held in Mumbai, India. The festival features a flagship 50 Hour Filmmaking Challenge, where participants are given 50 hours to make a film after which a panel of judges select award winners. The competition has run each September since 2011 and is deemed as largest creative collaborative activity. Competitors form teams and are given a common theme to which they then write a script and shoot the films. They have a free choice of locations, equipment and actors. The teams are also responsible for post-production including editing and audio. In 2020, IFP introduced a 50 Hour Music Challenge, where participants produce tracks from scratch within 50 hours.

From 2016, the organizers added a two-day on-ground festival in Mumbai which talks about various aspects of creation across films, digital, literature and music with interesting conversations, workshops and performances. Over 20,000 content enthusiasts attend the festival every year making it one umbrella place for creators.

In 2017, IFP also added Writing Challenge, Storytelling Challenge and Design Challenge. In 2022, IFP also added Standup Challenge and Photography Challenge

History 
IFP was started by Ritam Bhatnagar in 2011 as the Ahmedabad Film Project, a competition for local filmmakers. In 2013 it was renamed the India Film Project, admitting entrants from other countries from 2014. The eleventh edition held in September October 2021 received entries from over 400 cities and 41 countries. In 2022, the festival was renamed as 'IFP' owing to festival expanding horizons from films to other creative domains such as digital, literature & writing, OTT, storytelling, visual art, performing arts, audio and podcasting, photography, gaming, tech and culture.

Season 1
The first Ahmedabad Film Project in 2011 received 86 entries from 18 cities. Filmmaker Sanjay Gadhvi was the jury member. More than 600 filmmakers participated in the event. The theme for the filmmaking competition was 'Small things in life'. As founder Ritam says, "The motive of beginning this festival was to attract people towards filmmaking, considered a niche hobby back then". "The festival was meant to be a one-time activity, but the response was too good to make it an annual happening" he adds.

Season 2

The 2012 Edition saw more than 1200 filmmakers, 120 teams from 24 cities across India, competing against each other to win the title of Best Film. Well-known Filmmakers like Shoojit Sircar, Vikramaditya Motwane, Rajesh Mapuskar and Komal Nahta were part of the jury. The theme 'Ingredients of Good Living' caught well with the filmmakers with some of the best films coming out of the competition.

Season 3 
The 2013 Edition of India Film Project saw as many as 4200+ filmmakers from 40 cities across India and neighbouring countries. The film project went online by allowing participants to shoot films from their own cities and uploading online. The project extended their filmmaking hours from 48 hours to 50 hours. The project kicked off on 20 September 2014. Versatile and award-winning filmmakers like Tigmanshu Dhulia, Nikhil Advani and Bejoy Nambiar served as the jury members. For the first time in India, an online film festival was a part of 2013 edition in association with NFDC, which allowed everyone to watch their favourite films online on their computer screen. The winning films of 2013 edition received amazing response such that they were selected for Jaipur International Film Festival for special screening.

Season 4 

The 2014 edition of IFP was announced on 28 May. The festival claimed to reach out to filmmakers from smaller towns and other countries through previous year's winning film screenings. The official trailer of 2014 edition was revealed on 4 June, which featured a military theme. The trailer was shot with extensive use of VFX and sent out the message 'Shoot before you get shot'.

The jury for 2014 edition was announced in First week of August. The jury consisted of one of the Indian cinema's most prolific name Shyam Benegal and much acclaimed filmmakers Hansal Mehta, Omung Kumar and Umesh Shukla.

More than 8500 filmmakers participated in the edition from 85 cities across the world, mostly India, Singapore, Nepal, Pakistan, Indonesia, Dubai, USA and UK. Almost 500 films were made in the challenge over the 50 hours beginning on 12 September 2014.

Axis Bank and Mountain Dew had extended support to 2014 edition so that more and more filmmakers can avail the benefit of this activity.

Season 5 

The 2015 edition of IFP took the wings off festival to make it truly international. More than 14000 filmmakers are said to participate in this edition from 18 countries. The fifth season was announced on 15 May 2015 and the trailer was released on 15 June. The 2015 trailer was shot using a technique called visual illusion and garnered huge popularity amongst participants.

The festival lined up some very prominent faces of Bollywood who came forward as jury members. Two times National award winners Ketan Mehta and Onir along with film critic Raja Sen took up the mammoth task of judging 700+ films. The festival also saw its first female jury member Guneet Monga who was much appraised by the festival fans.

The festival saw huge participation from south Indian states such as Telangana, AP, Karnataka and Tamil Nadu with huge filmmaking fans flocking to the event. Apart from India, participation was seen from USA, UK, Germany, Singapore, Dubai, Australia, Sri Lanka, Bhutan, Pakistan, Malaysia and other countries. The filmmaking hours started on 18 September and ended on 20 September. Considering the huge scale of festival, the award ceremony is expected to have more than 3000 people attend the gathering.

Season 6 

IFP 2016 was the festival's first edition to be held outside Ahmedabad. The festival officially moved to Mumbai as its new home ground. The 50-hour filmmaking competition saw more than 23,600 filmmakers who took part and made 1,220 films over the weekend. The theme announced was 'Top of the World'. The jury for the festival was Madhur Bhandarkar, Nagesh Kukunoor, Sriram Raghavan and southern super director Vetrimaaran. A good number of teams also participated from China, Dubai, US, and 16 more countries.

The grand finale held on 1 October at Mumbai. Tanmay Bhat, Ashish Shakya and Gursimran Khamba from All India Bakchod were seen along with Vasan Bala conversing about how web content in India was catching up pace and becoming a new entertainment destination for millennials.

Kanan Gill lead a conversation on 'How not to make a film' where he took the audience view of content creation. East India Comedy was represented by Sorabh Pant, Angad Singh and Azeem Banatwala, seen conversing with Raja Sen about importance of giving offence. Nikhil Taneja from Y-Films along with Anupama Chopra, Nidhi Bisht and Sameer Saxena from The Viral Fever conversed about the anatomy of making and distributing a web-series, a rather new form of content for youngsters. Karan Talwar and Anisha Rickshawalli joined Raja Sen in discussing about Split Personality on screen. Apart from conversations, the day also included a workshop on short storytelling and short filmmaking conducted by Terribly Tiny Tales and a screening of popular web films by Pocket Films.

The evening also saw Sumeet Vyas, Nidhi Singh of Permanent Roommates fame, Naveen Kasturia, Maanvi Gagroo and Amol Parashar from The Viral Fever. The event was hosted by RJ Megha, Malishka RJ and Rishi Kapoor. The event was attended by over 8,000 film enthusiasts from around the country.

Season 7 

The 2017 festival was held at Nehru Center in Mumbai on 30 September and 1 October. More than 29,000 filmmakers from 18 countries participated in the 50-hour challenge, creating over 1,503 films, each of them 4 to 6 minutes, on the theme 'Everything is connected' over a weekend. The jury for the seventh edition of the festival was Ram Madhvani, Aniruddha Roy Chowdhury and Vipul Amrutlal Shah.

The 'Best of Digital' awards for YouTube videos were introduced with 5,512 nominations in 7 categories. Two other challenges added to festival were a Short scriptwriting challenge that was executed in association with Terribly Tiny Tales and a Poster Design challenge in association with The Souled Store.

The festival had 16,000 visitors attending conversations, workshops and screenings.  The Viral Fever's new web-series called Inmates had its premiere at the festival, five days before its official launch.

The festival saw the likes of Ashutosh Gowariker, Devdutt Pattanaik, Nikkhil Advani, Irshad Kamil, Prajakta Koli, Nidhi Bisht, Neha Dhupia, Dia Mirza, Kunal Kapoor, Baradwaj Rangan, Kunal Kohli, Harsh Beniwal, Prahlad Kakkar, Siddharth Mahadevan, Vasan Bala and over 80 other speakers.

Cinthol, Maruti Suzuki, Hotstar, Nokia and Gujarat Tourism were the main sponsors of the event.

Season 8 

IFP Season 8 saw over 32,000 filmmakers participating and producing 1,550 short films in a duration of 50 hours. The eighth season saw participation from over 300 cities and 30 countries, with teams coming in from USA, UK, Ireland, Australia, Singapore, Dubai, Germany, China, France and more. This was the first time that IFP declared separate theme for each of its categories, namely Professional, Amateur and Mobile. The jury for the 50 Hour Filmmaking Challenge were Sudhir Mishra, Milan Luthria and RS Prasanna.

The two-day festival in Mumbai was spread across four stages, talking about creation, collaboration and celebration of content. Over 16,000 visitors attended the two-day festival, consisting of engaging conversations, screenings, workshops and Ask me Anythings. The festival saw presence of Alexander Payne, Ayushmann Khurana, Bhumi Pednekar, Kartik Aaryan, Vicky Kaushal, Ashwin Sanghi, Vidya Vox, Shankar Tucker, Bhuvan Bam, Prajakta Koli, Hansal Mehta, Ashwini Iyer Tiwary, Benny Dayal, Kunal Roy Kapoor, Anupama Chopra, Mithila Palkar, Dhruv Sehgal, Rajeev Masand, Vikramaditya Motwane, Bejoy Nambiar, Sona Mohapatra, Mallika Dua, Kaneez Surka, Ashish Chanchlani and over 70 more artists. The Viral Fever's upcoming series Hostel Daze and Dice Media's What the Folks Season 2 were premiered at the festival.

The festival also saw three challenges: Poster Design Challenge for designers, Short Scriptwriting Challenge for writers and Voice Your Words Challenge for Storytellers.

Datsun, Lifebuoy, IMDb, Johnnie Walker and Gujarat Tourism were the main sponsors of the season 8.

Season 9 

IFP Season 9, held in September–October timelines, saw over 36,000 filmmakers participating and producing 1,710 short films in a duration of 50 hours. The participation came from 320 cities and 18 countries, with teams from USA, UK, Australia, Turkey, Dubai, Singapore and many more. The jury for the Challenge were Abhishek Chaubey, Anjani Menon, Pan Nalin and Pradeep Sarkar.

The two-day festival was moved to Mehboob Studios at Bandra, Mumbai at a fairly large venue to accommodate the growing community. Over 17,000 creators from 58 cities travelled down to attend the festival, which was spread across 4 stages, with interesting conversations, workshops and screenings. The festival saw presence of Naseeruddin Shah, Javed Akhtar, Manoj Bajpayee, Rajkummar Rao, Divya Dutta, Swara Bhaskar, Ishaan Khatter, Radhika Madan, Jim Sarbh, Devdutt Pattanaik, Vikramaditya Motwane, Prajakta Koli, Zakir Khan, Abish Mathew, Ashish Shakya, Aparshakti Khurrana, Gulshan Devaiah, Anupama Chopra, Anand Gandhi, Kusha Kapila, Jordindian, Be Younick, Beer Biceps, Gaurav Taneja, Kaneez Surka, Gaurav Gera, Ritviz, Naezy Mikey McCleary, Ahsaas Channa, Anand Tiwari, Yahya Bootwala, Amandeep Singh, Kubbra Sait and over 80 more artists. The workshops on post-production, cinematic lighting, pitching, visual effects, use of gimbal, creativity, visual storytelling, self care and many other sessions were introduced to reach out to relevant audiences. The poster of Divya Dutta and Swara Bhaskar's upcoming film Sheer Qorma was launched at the festival amidst much fanfare. Mikhil Musale's upcoming film Made in China starring Rajkumar Rao also launched its teaser at the festival.

The festival also saw huge participation across Scriptwriting Challenge, Storytelling Challenge and Design Challenge. The winning stories from Storytelling Challenge were later converted in to audiobooks. The winning posters from the Design Challenge are being merchandised and sold to larger audiences across India.

Signature, Myntra, Exide, Adobe, Nikon, DJI, Kingston and Gujarat Tourism were the principal sponsors of the season 9.

Season 10 
IFP Season 10 saw over 53,000 unique creators participate across challenges and over 27,000 creators attend the 4 day virtual festival. Festival Director Ritam Bhatnagar quoted "Season 10 was nothing short of a miracle. To pull off a festival with over 65,000 unique creators in challenges and virtual festival amidst times when most festivals were getting cancelled has been our feat in itself". The participation came from 343 cities and 23 countries.

The 50 Hour Filmmaking saw approximately 38,000 filmmakers participate and create 1804 short films over a weekend. The festival also introduced a 50 Hour Music Challenge, one of its kind which saw 1,200 original tracks made by 11,000 participating musicians from across 7 countries. The festival saw surge in participation across Scriptwriting, Storytelling and Design Challenge.

The organisers announced a 4-day virtual festival that saw over 27,000 attendees across 3 stages. Some of the people on IFP's stage in 2020 were Nawazuddin Siddiqui, Maiteryi Ramakrishnan, Bhumi Pednekar, Mira Nair, Shabana Azmi, Pankaj Tripathi, Adil Hussain, Kirti Kulhari, Gajraj Rao, Shweta Tripathi, Vikrant Massey, Resul Pookutty, Mumbiker Nikhil, Beyounick, Rasika Dugal, Ratna Pathak Shah, Kabir Akhtar, Karthik Subbaraj, David Jones, Guneet Monga, Madhu Trehan, Kusha Kapila, Mohd. Zeeshan Ayyub, Dolly Singh, Sumeet Vyas, Amol Parashar, Maanvi Gagroo, Jaideep Ahlawat, Jim Sarbh, Pulkit Samrat, Kriti Kharbanda, Priya Malik and over 140 artists on the stage. The festival also saw workshops on cinematography, pre-production, music production, illustrations, doodling, sound design and many more by GoPro, Sennheiser, Spotify, Celtx, XP Pen, etc.

OnePlus, Bumble, Tata Sky, Acer, Fujifilm, MUBI were the main sponsors for the season 10.

Season 11 
Amidst the covid chaos, the organisers decided to continue season 11 as a virtual festival. The season saw over 65,000 unique creators participate across the 5 creative challenges and over 29,000 creators attend the 4 day virtual festival, held from 21 to 24 October 2021. The festival saw participation from over 417 cities and 31 unique countries, making it one of the most widely spread participation.

Flagship 50 Hour Filmmaking Challenge saw 32,300 filmmakers creating 1,527 short films from 24 to 26 Sep 2021. The 50 Hour Music Challenge in its second edition saw over 11,600 musicians from over 11 countries creating 1,087 tracks across Pop, Hip Hop, Folk Fusion, Electronic and Rock genres.

The 7 Day Storytelling, Writing and Design challenges were further bifurcated to include poetry, short stories, digital illustrations and digital collages respectively.

The 4 day virtual festival diversified to also include conversations about game development, photography, technology, advertising and performing arts. Spread across 4 stages, festival saw some of the culture shaping artists on stage including Taapsee Pannu, Vicky Kaushal, Emraan Hashmi, R Madhavan, Vir Das, Shoojit Sircar, Vikram Motwane, Prateek Kuhad, Ritviz, Bhuvan Bam, Anuja Chauhan, Amish Tripathi, Emma Donoghue, Tom Perrotta, Asif Kapadia, Ranveer Allahbadia, Saloni Gaur, Sayani Gupta, Ankur Tewari, Anuv Jain, Ayush Mehra, Brodha V, Dar Gai, Guneet Monga, Hanif Kureshi, Kausar Munir, Shalmali Kholgade, Swanand Kirkire, Lifafa, MC Altaf, Prateek vats, Seema Pahwa and over 150 others.

The festival was sponsored by Vivo, Signature, DSP Mutual Fund, Fujifilm, Intel, DishTV, Sennheiser, MUBI and Punjab Tourism and saw support from partners like Ableton, Audient, First Draft, FL Studio, Pantone, Filmfare, TVF and many more.

Labs

Web Writers' Lab 
In 2018, IFP started an exclusive lab for writers in web domain along with Pocket Aces. The lab saw over 1200 applications and 10 selected writers underwent a seven-day residential program at Mumbai. The lab was mentored by leading writers from Indian web content ecosystem including Dhruv Sehgal.

In 2020, the second season of lab took place in middle of pandemic, receiving more than 2000 applications for a 5-day virtual residency program.

Podcast Lab 
In 2021, IFP partnered with Spotify and Anchor to create India's first lab for podcasters, a 25 week long program to mentor and handhold aspiring podcasters for producing their first season. The lab saw over 1200 applicants and 200 podcasters from 63 cities were selected as a part of first batch after a thorough interview process. The lab included mentors like Anupama Chopra, Varun Duggirala, Mantra, Chhavi Sachdev, Kedar Nimkar, Mayank Shekhar, Joshua Thomas and many more.

Timebound Challenges

50 Hour Filmmaking Challenge 
Started in 2011, 50 Hour Filmmaking Challenge is IFP's flagship challenge that has seen over 1.85 Lac filmmakers participate in last 11 years. The challenge is one of the largest filmmaking challenge in the world, with participation from all 5 continents. Participants can choose to participate across Professional, Amateur or Mobile category depending on their experience and equipment usage. In 2015, the challenge was made open to films made in all languages. The winning films from the challenge were broadcast on MTV India in IFP's official show called IFP Shorts.

50 Hour Music Challenge 
Added in 2020, the concept according to organisers was derived from already existing rule of creating original music in the 50 Hour Filmmaking Challenge. The challenge has 5 genres that participants can choose from, namely Pop, Rock, Hip Hip, Folk Fusion and Electronic. The musicians are required to create original piece of music in just 50 hours on a given theme, which is later judged by pre-jury and jury.

7 Day Design Challenge 
Running since 2017, the challenge was initially launched as a poster design challenge, inviting designers to recreate movie posters on a given theme. In 2020, an additional category of Fan Art was added to the challenge. Owing to huge participation in 2020 and continuous demand for adding even more categories, Digital Illustrations and Digital Collage were additionally added in 2021.

7 Day Writing Challenge 
Introduced in 2017, the challenge has been participated by over 9,000 writers in last 5 years. Initially, the challenge saw only short scriptwriting as an accepted format. However, owing to challenge's popularity amongst writers across the world, a short story category was later added in 2021. The participation has come from over 440 cities and 28 countries.

7 Day Storytelling Challenge 
Storytelling challenge was brought to light in 2018 with spoken word as it's only category. In 2021, poetry was added since organisers felt both were active form of performing arts expressions. In last 4 years, over 5,500 performers have participated actively from over 14 countries with major participation coming in English and Hindi languages.

Previous Winners

See also
 All India Bakchod
 East India Comedy
 The Viral Fever

References

External links 
 Official website

Film festivals in Maharashtra
Entertainment events in India
Competitions in India
Annual events in India
Internet film festivals
Festivals in Mumbai